In enzymology, a flavonol-3-O-triglucoside O-coumaroyltransferase is an enzyme that catalyzes the chemical reaction

4-coumaroyl-CoA + a flavonol 3-O-[beta-D-glucosyl-(1->2)-beta-D-glucosyl-(1->2)-beta-D-glucoside]  CoA + a flavonol 3-O-[6-(4-coumaroyl)-beta-D-glucosyl-(1->2)-beta-D-glucosyl-(1->2)- beta-D-glucoside]

The 3 substrates of this enzyme are 4-coumaroyl-CoA, flavonol, and [[3-O-beta-D-glucosyl-(1->2)-beta-D-glucosyl-(1->2)-beta-D-glucoside]], whereas its 4 products are CoA, flavonol, [[3-O-[6-(4-coumaroyl)-beta-D-glucosyl-(1->2)-beta-D-glucosyl-(1->2)-]], and beta-D-glucoside].

This enzyme belongs to the family of transferases, to be specific those acyltransferases transferring groups other than aminoacyl groups.  The systematic name of this enzyme class is 4-coumaroyl-CoA:flavonol-3-O-[beta-D-glucosyl-(1->2)-beta-D-glucosid e] 6-O-4-coumaroyltransferase.

References 

 

EC 2.3.1
Enzymes of unknown structure
Flavanols metabolism